John Sanderson (born c. 1919) was a footballer who played at inside-right for Port Vale around World War II.

Career
Sanderson joined Port Vale from Newcastle United in June 1938. He made his debut in the 1938–39 season, and played the first two matches of the cancelled 1939–40 season, before war broke out. He returned to The Old Recreation Ground in March 1945, but failed to gain a regular spot and was given a free transfer in May 1946.

Career statistics
Source:

References

1910s births
Year of death missing
English footballers
Association football forwards
Newcastle United F.C. players
Port Vale F.C. players
English Football League players